Fascifodina is a marine trace fossil of uncertain origin from the Ordovician of North America. It has either been interpreted as arm traces of an orthocerid cephalopod or interconnected burrows of an unknown animal.

References

Trace fossils of North America